Victor Bay is a bay about  wide and  long, indenting the coast between Pourquoi Pas Point and Mathieu Rock, Antarctica. The bay is marked by an extensive chain of icebergs breaking away from the high tongue of Commandant Charcot Glacier. It was delineated from aerial photographs taken by U.S. Navy Operation Highjump, 1946–47, and named by the Advisory Committee on Antarctic Names (US-ACAN) for Paul-Emile Victor, the Director of the Expeditions Polaires Francaises, who organized French expeditions to Greenland in 1948-51 and Antarctica in 1948-53 and 1955–56.

Bays of Adélie Land